PTCL is the acronym for Pakistan Telecommunication Company Limited, a telecommunications company in Pakistan.

PTCL may also refer to:
 Peripheral T-cell lymphoma
 Physical and Theoretical Chemistry Laboratory, University of Oxford, England